Gumbaynggir language (also spelled Gumbaingari, Kumbainggar, Kumbaingeri, Gambalamam, and also called Baanbay) is an Australian Aboriginal language spoken by the Gumbaynggirr, who are native to the Mid North Coast of New South Wales. Gumbaynggir is the only surviving language in the Gumbaynggiric family of Pama–Nyungan stock.

It has a binary way of counting numbers.

Phonology

Vowels

Consonants

Voiced stops may also be realised as voiceless sounds [p, k, c, t], when occurring in intervocalic positions.

Revitalization
Organised revitalisation of Gumbaynggir has been underway since 1986 when Muurrbay Aboriginal Language and Culture Co-operative was founded at Nambucca Heads. Classes in Gumbaynggir are taught through the North Coast Institute of TAFE up to Certificate II level.

Muurrbay and Many Rivers Aboriginal Language Centre (MRALC) supports Aboriginal language revitalization through activities that include:

- Providing access to linguistic expertise, and training for Aboriginal people.

- Recording languages wherever possible, and assisting with access to archival materials, providing a regional storage base for these materials.

- Producing language materials such as dictionaries or wordlists, grammars, learner's guides, transcriptions and translations.

- Providing community access to languages by using, and assisting communities to use information technology such as: Transcriber, Shoebox, Powerpoint and Adobe Audition.

- Employing linguists, Aboriginal language researchers and specialists in Information and Communication Technology.

- Raising awareness in the wider community about the value of Aboriginal languages.

In recent years, the Bularri Muurlay Nyanggan Aboriginal Corporation (BMNAC), established in 2010 by Gumbaynggirr and Bundjalung man Clark Webb, has made great efforts to revitalise the Gumbaynggirr language. The BMNAC started in 2010 when two after school learning centres were set up at Wongala Estate Aboriginal Reserve and Woolgoolga High School. A third after school Learning Centre was established at William Bayldon Primary School in Sawtell in 2012.   

Further efforts from the BMNAC saw the  Gumbaynggirr Giingana Freedom School open in February 2022. The first independent Indigenous bilingual primary school to ever operate in New South Wales.  The school caters to students from K-2, and operates under the ethos of “Bularri Muurlay Nyanggan” meaning “Two Path Strong” in Gumbaynggirr language.

Funding
Muurrbay Aboriginal Language and Culture Cooperative Ltd at Bellwood receives funding from the following government organizations:

- The Australian Government has an Indigenous Languages Support (ILS) program which gives money to community driven digital and multi-media resources as a tool for maintenance, revival and development of native languages

- New South Wales Department of Aboriginal Affairs has funded the Muurrbay Center Sydney based Aboriginal Languages Summer School

In November 2011, the Australian government declared an Indigenous Protected Area for the Gumbaynggirr people.  The Indigenous Protected Areas act protects the native land of indigenous Australians.  The protection of the land ties into the spiritual beliefs of the Gumbaynggirr people and by protecting the land, the government is helping revitalize their culture.

See also
 List of Aboriginal languages of New South Wales

References

External links 
 Bibliography of Gumbaynggir people and language resources, at the Australian Institute of Aboriginal and Torres Strait Islander Studies
 Rosetta Project: Kumbainggar Swadesh List

Gumbaynggiric languages
Indigenous Australian languages in New South Wales
Critically endangered languages